Paavo Järvi (born 30 December 1962) is an Estonian-American conductor. He has been chief conductor of Zurich's Tonhalle since 2020.

Early life
Järvi was born in Tallinn, Estonia, to Liilia Järvi and the Estonian conductor Neeme Järvi. His siblings, Kristjan Järvi and Maarika Järvi, are also musicians. After leaving Estonia, the family settled in the USA, Järvi studied privately with Leonid Grin in Philadelphia, at the Curtis Institute of Music with Max Rudolf and Otto-Werner Mueller, and at the Los Angeles Philharmonic Institute with Leonard Bernstein.

Career
From 1994 to 1997, Järvi was principal conductor of the Malmö Symphony Orchestra. From 1995 to 1998, he shared the title of principal conductor of the Royal Stockholm Philharmonic Orchestra with Sir Andrew Davis.  Järvi  was music director of the Cincinnati Symphony Orchestra from 2001 to 2011. The orchestra made a number of recordings for the Telarc label during Järvi's tenure. In May 2011, he was named the orchestra's Music Director Laureate.  Since 2004, he has been the Artistic Director of the Deutsche Kammerphilharmonie, Bremen and an Artistic Advisor to the Estonian National Symphony Orchestra. In 2006, Järvi became the Principal Conductor of the Frankfurt Radio Symphony Orchestra, and served in the post until 2014. In 2010, he became Music Director of the Orchestre de Paris, concluding his tenure in 2016, the same year in which he was named Artist of the Year by both Gramophone and Diapason magazines.  
 
Järvi is the founder and artistic director of both the Pärnu Music Festival and the Estonian Festival Orchestra.  Järvi first guest-conducted the Tonhalle Orchestra in 2009, and returned in December 2016.  In May 2017, the Tonhalle-Orchester Zürich announced the appointment of Järvi as its next chief conductor, effective with the 2019–2020 season, with an initial contract of five years.  In December 2022, the orchestra announced an extension of Järvi's contract as its chief conductor through the 2028-2029 season.

Outside of Europe, in June 2012, the NHK Symphony Orchestra announced the appointment of Järvi as its chief conductor, beginning in the 2015–2016 season, with an initial contract of three years, which was extended a further three years to 2021.  In November 2019, the NHK Symphony announced an extension of his contract through August 2022, at which time he stood down as its chief conductor.

Järvi has recorded for such labels as RCA, Deutsche Grammophon, PENTATONE, Telarc, ECM, BIS and Virgin Records.  His Virgin Classics recording of Sibelius Cantatas with the Estonian National Symphony Orchestra, Estonian National Male Choir and Ellerhein Girls Choir won a Grammy Award for "Best Choral Performance".

Personal life
Järvi has two daughters, Lea and Ingrid, from his past marriage to the violinist Tatiana Berman.  Järvi was featured in the documentary Maestro, directed by David Donnelly. He became an American citizen in 1985.

Awards
 2003: Grammy Awards
 2012: Hindemith Prize of the City of Hanau
 2012: Commandeur de L'Ordre des Arts et des Lettres
 2013: Order of the White Star, Estonia
 2015: Sibelius Medal

References

External links
 Official website of Paavo Järvi
 Paavo Järvi's non-profit foundation supporting the Arts
 Official website of the Pärnu Music Festival
 Official website of the Estonian Festival Orchestra
 Official website of HarrisonParrott
 Official website of the documentary film Maestro
 Bach Cantatas website biography of Paavo Järvi
 
 

1962 births
21st-century conductors (music)
American conductors (music)
American male conductors (music)
EMI Classics and Virgin Classics artists
Estonian conductors (music)
Estonian emigrants to the United States
Living people
Musicians from New Jersey
People from Rumson, New Jersey
Musicians from Tallinn
Grammy Award winners
21st-century American musicians
People of the Royal Stockholm Philharmonic Orchestra
Curtis Institute of Music alumni
Recipients of the Order of the White Star, 3rd Class
Erato Records artists